Model worker (abbreviated as 劳模 or láomó) refers to an exemplary worker who exhibits some or all of the traits appropriate to the ideal of the socialism. Exemplary worker come from various sectors of the Chinese economy, including the industry, agricultural, service and the cultural sectors to show the inclusiveness of the People's Republic of China. Echoing the gender equality advocate of the Chinese Communist Party (CCP), both men and women comprise the pool of model workers. Since the founding of the People's Republic in 1949, thousands of male and female model workers have been selected from a wide range of sectors. A few model workers also came from ethnic minority groups to show the ethnic unity policy of the CCP. Higher authorities take charge of the decision on selecting model worker based on their work performance, and political consciousness, patriotism, "worship of science," activities in environmental protection, and the pursuit of excellence. National model workers are selected in China by central and provincial-level departments. Some cities and large companies also have processes for selecting and praising local model workers.

Displaying the ideals of the socialism, model worders bear the highest expectations from the new state to guide and correct their fellow workers in everyday production and behavior. The Model Workers are supposed to inspire people by their own work performance and political consciousness by setting good examples. People learn from the Model Workers and can become the new citizens the state requires. On the other hand, the Model Worker is also a coercive project. It attempts at aggressively correct people who are outliers of the new socialist scheme. Outliers become “bad elements” in contrast to the “good” Model Workers and the outliers are also forced to reform themselves.

The state consistently uses model worker as one of the central propaganda strategies to realize socialist goals. As a political term, it originates from the Yan’an period of the Chinese Communist Party in the 1930s. The party leaders introduced the Soviet Stakhanovite model and hoped to increase agricultural and industrial productivity when it was cut off from military resources in the Shaan-Gan-Ning border region. After the Communist Revolution in 1949, the Model Worker policy continues as a fundamental component of the political and cultural system in the new state. It plays a key role in many of the political campaigns such as the Great Leap Forward by setting up exemplary workers who define the ideal production. As a propaganda tool, the Model Worker has wide visual representations in cinema and posters to broadcast the ideals of the socialist state to China's vast population. Underlying the propaganda, the appeals of nationalism, the development of socialism and economic prosperity based on a new system propel the application of Model Worker in the People's Republic. The Maoist ideology composed of these three elements seeks to transform people's thought and behaviors on the road of creating new citizens for the new socialist China. The Model Workers represents the concrete examples of how the state wishes to intervene in the daily lives and production of ordinary people.

Model workers are often afforded privileges not available to other citizens or Communist Party members. "The possibility to become a model worker offered peasants and workers one of the few opportunities for upward mobility other than joining the army," writes scholar Yu Miin-lin. Model workers have an easier time joining the Communist Party, and also to become a higher-level cadre, manager, or other leader.

Historical development

The Republican era (1936-1949) 
In the late 1930s, the Chinese Communist Party (CCP) introduced the Soviet Stakhanovism to the Shaan-Gan-Ning border region under its control. Decades of military conflict with Kuomintang forced the CCP to the northwest where it strove to survive by promoting agricultural productivity and military strength. Stakhanovism originated from the Second Five-Year Plan of the Soviet Union and carried strong Soviet traits. However, the Chinese Communist leadership did not borrow the idea without mediation. Under the influence of the Stakhanovist predecessor, Model Worker campaigns were launched to increase productivity and the popularity of the Party among the people in the border region.

Stakhanovism was rooted in the Russian literature and the Soviet context. According to scholar Yu Miin-lin, a Stakhanovite in the Russian stories refers to an optimistic hero who was willing to devote himself to the larger good. He acts without meaningless talk. It later referred to young soldiers in the Communist brigades who were diligent and efficient in fulfilling production quotas. The Soviet leaders realized the potential significance of the Stakhanovite image in promoting productivity facing the Second Five-Year Plan. They made miners and other obscure workers as “national heroes” nationwide to stimulate competition to complete the production quota. Stakhanovism thus symbolized the labor momentum to construct socialism in the Soviet Union. The ideal Stakhanovite refers to someone who bridged the gap between manual labor and mental labor, and someone who worked efficiently but could enjoy high class culture during leisure times.

When the Soviet Stakhanovite movement was about to run out of steam due to routinization by mid 1930s, the Chinese Communist Party sought to borrow the idea to the border region under its control. The Party aimed at eradicating the three major differences that haunted China: the difference between manual labor and mental labor, the difference between the city and the countryside, and the difference between factory work and farm work. And the Stakhanovite fit into the scheme of bridging the gap between the three major differences and provided a ready-made example for the Party to remake the people.

The CCP adapted the Soviet Stakhanovism to suit the practical situation on the ground. Yu Miin-lin notes that the earliest CCP mentioning of Stakhanovism can be dated back to 1936, though the Party did not implement Stakhanovite campaign until 1942 when the Kuomintang cut off from supplies in the border region. In the Great Production Campaign, a factory worker named Zhao Zhankui 赵占魁 was chosen by the Party leaders as the Chinese Stakhanovite. The CCP leaders avoided using the wording of “Stakhanovite” to simplify the propaganda and Zhao Zhankui became equivalent of hard work and high political consciousness. Here high political consciousness referred broadly to the love for work and devotion to the public good.

As the Zhao Zhankui campaign proved successful, CCP routinized the Model Worker system in the border region and carried it over across 1949 after its victory over the Kuomintang. The CCP leadership regularly held conferences for labor models in the border region, and awarded them with certificates. Model Worker was one of the fundamental propaganda policies to stimulate the economic production in the border region under the CCP.

Early PRC (1949-1966) 
Four major national conferences for Model Workers were held in the 1950s until the end of the Cultural Revolution. Each conference signaled the turning points of the socialist construction in Maoist China. And the selection and the propaganda around Model Workers functioned as support for and confirmation of the official narrative.

In late September 1950, the National Conference for Model Workers of Battlefield Heroes, Workers, Peasants and Soldiers was held in Beijing. Mao Zedong delivered a speech at the beginning of the Conference to celebrate liberation of major parts of China thanks to the “excellence performance of workers from the military and economic fronts.” Although the Party just won in the Civil War over Kuomintang, Mao warned that China still confronted the military threats from the “American imperialists” and Chiang Kai-shek regime on Taiwan, so that it was imperative for the Chinese workers to continue consolidating national defense for the construction of the nation in the long term. To encourage workers to participate in building socialism, this Conference awarded 464 model workers, among whom 208 were from the industrial sector, 198 from the agricultural sector and 58 others from the military. About one tenth of the model workers were female.

The CCP launched a series of radical social revolutions in the early 1950s. The Land Reform destroyed the traditional rural order by distributing land to peasants. The CCP leaders mobilized peasants to exert violent struggles against “class enemies” such as the “landlords” and “rich peasants.” By the end of the Land Reform in 1952, violence was excessive and killing was widespread in the countryside that the Party leaders had to restrain the movement. When the Party announced the Land Reform successful, it implemented the Three- and Five-Anti Campaigns in the urban areas. The two Campaigns aimed at eradicating corruptive behavior and bureaucratic practices within the Party itself to preempt capitalist tendency. Meanwhile, the Campaigns served to “rectify” the Model Workers to create pure new citizens.

Many Model Workers were found to be indulged in materials comfort after the nominations. Yu Miin-lin lists several major categories of rewards Model Workers could receive. The first category was mainly honorific. Many attendees for the Model Worker Conference were invited to Beijing and had the rare chance to visit the capital. The second reward concerns promising official careers as party members. Many Model Workers thus became party members, enjoying a smooth and fast route of upward mobility. As a new invention after 1949, the third category includes superior material gains compared to their co-workers. Model Workers enjoyed vacation, the chance to travel abroad to the Soviet Union and housing offers. All these honorific and material provisions made Model Workers a privileged class in Maoist China. Having the thought that their former co-workers were inferior to them, some of them refused to treat the co-workers equally. They not only failed to complete their own tasks but also asked others to do it for them. Acts like these greatly jeopardized the reputation of the Model Workers and the propaganda related to it.

In 1956, the Second National Conference for Advanced Producers was held in Beijing to sum up the experiences of the social-political movements during the first half of the 1950s and to motivate workers for China's First Five Year Plan. The change of title from “model worker” to “advanced producers” might be resulted from the inclusion of intellectuals during the Hundred Flower Campaign from 1956 to 1957. According to the assumption of Yu Miin-lin, “advanced producers” suggested the convergence of both manual and mental labor. This period witnessed a shift of focus of the Model Worker propaganda. As the previous social structure had been destructed, a new way of class struggle emerged, according to Mao. The opposition between the “revolutionaries” and the “counterrevolutionaries” dominated the Model Worker project. Propagandists tended to depict the dichotomy between the right versus the wrong, the bright and the dark in constructing the images of Model Workers.

The third National Conference for Model Workers was held in 1959 at the peak of the Great Leap Forward which called for accelerated speed of production and socialist construction. The Model Workers propaganda provided examples of hard work and political devotion to the Party's calls. All kinds of posters and stories about heroic deeds of Model Workers in iron production were disseminated nationwide as inspiration for people to believe in the possibility of “Overtaking the Britain and Surpassing America.”

In June 1960, The National Conference for Advanced Producers in Education, Culture, Public Health, Sports, News was held in Beijing. Among the 5806 attendees, 3092 of them were awarded the title of “Advanced Producers.”

The Cultural Revolution Period (1966-1977) 
The selection and national conferences for Model Workers were interrupted by the Cultural Revolution. James Farley argues that the Model Workers propaganda campaigns in fact laid the foundation for the arrival of the Cultural Revolution. The creation of “pure” and “perfected” Model Workers brewed the cult of personality for Mao. For example, Lei Feng embodies all the qualities the state requires for socialist construction, including love for the nation, selflessness, devotion to work without thinking about repayment, etc.

During the Cultural Revolution, many Model Workers were heavily struggled against by the Red Guards because of their family background and/or their previous association with “bourgeois” lifestyles. Some other Model Workers joined the Red Guards and the Revolutionary Committee, taking the orders from above to struggle against others. They soon lost power after the 10-year turmoil during the Cultural Revolution.

Reform era (1977-present) 
The selection and national conference of Model Workers did not resume until 1977 when the National Conference for Learning from Daqing was held in the Daqing Oil Field and Beijing. The Conference called for the further elimination of the Gang of Four, and tried to motivate people all across the country to learn from Daqing's perseverance in technology and frugality in management.

In 1978, two more national conferences for Model Workers were held: the National Conference of Science and Technology and National Conference of Learning from Daqing and Dazhai in Finance and Trade. In 1979, another national conference was held to award “Advanced Producers” in industrial transportation, agricultural, finance and trade, education, and scientific research. These conferences at the beginning of the reform era differed from each other in title, scale, frequency, subjects and selection criteria. The national conference for Model Workers had not yet been institutionalized.

From 1989 onwards, the national conference for Model Workers underwent increasing institutionalization in three ways. First, all the various previous name of the conference became “The National Conference for Appraising Model Workers and Advanced Producers”. Second, it became a comprehensive conference covering both mental and manual laborers from all sectors. All workers enjoy the same standards of appraisal and rewards. Third, the selection of Model Workers became regular, taking place every five years, with each time awarding around 3,000 people. The system of “Two Reviews and Three Public Releases” was established to ensure that two reviews and three public releases on the departmental, local and national media will be made before the Model Workers are finalized.

Criteria for selection 
Model Workers are selected at various administrative levels to reward those workers who make great contribution to the construction of socialism. From the State Department to provincial, from municipal to county, governments award the honorific title of “Model Worker” to workers regularly. In theory, workers need to receive recommendations from the “mass” and then local governments above the county-level grant nominations to these workers. In practice, the “mass” seldom has the chance to recommend Model Workers of their choice. While recommendations and discussion are never enacted, the process was dominated by high-level cadres. Since the governments who grant nominations have different administrative levels, Model Workers also have different levels. The State Department nominates National Model Workers, while provincial, municipality directly under the central government, autonomous regional governments nominate Provincial Model Workers. Workers nominated by municipal and county governments are municipal and county Model Workers. Model Workers at all levels each has their corresponding criteria. Only those who meet the criteria can be qualified as Model Workers.

Model Workers are selected based on two general aspects. One aspect concerns contribution to the society. Another aspect concerns attitudes towards the society.

The specific requirements for the contribution to the society vary due to different levels (national, local and departmental) of the Model Workers. However, the general principle remains the same. For example, anyone who meets the following criteria may be nominated by the State Department as a Model Worker:

 People who greatly accomplish and overfill the production quota planned by the state.
 People who greatly improve the quality of products.
 People who greatly save material resources, money and labor, especially power, fuel, and raw materials.
 People who greatly transform and promote new technologies.
 People who greatly contribute to the research of science and technology, the design of products and engineering.
 People who greatly contribute to production, transportation, logistics, construction and management.
 People who greatly contribute to commerce (including foreign trade), service sector and finance.
 People who greatly contribute to culture, education, public health, and sports.
 People who greatly contribute to the administrative work for enterprises, industries and research institutions.

Aside from contribution to the society, attitudes towards the society are another strand of criteria to select Model Workers. In other words, the Communist Party leadership select Model Workers on the basis of their political consciousness and loyalty to the Party-state. Model Workers at all levels need to adhere to four principles: correctly treat the leadership of the Chinese Communist Party, Marxist–Leninism and Mao Zedong thought, People's Dictatorship, and the socialist course. The Model Workers should also adopt communist working attitudes as dismissing time and payment. Moreover, the Party mandates all Model Workers to love the Party and the state genuinely, love socialism and the people, love labor, struggle for the benefits of the Party-state and possess the sense of devotion for the construction of socialist material and spiritual civilizations.

Only those who both contribute greatly contribute to the society with high political consciousness can be selected and nominated as Model Worker. The Model Worker is a highly politicized and idealized part in the overall propaganda under the Chinese Communist Party.

Notable model workers

Zhao Zhankui 赵占魁 
Zhao Zhankui (1896-1973) was born in a poor peasant's family in Dingxiang County, Shanxi Province. He was awarded as “National Model Worker” in 1950 for his engagement in the “Zhao Zhankui Campaign” in the Shaan-Gan-Ning Border region in the late 1940s. Zhao is one of the first Model Workers and most important activist in the labor movement of early PRC.

Zhao Zhankui was born in a small village in Dingxiang County of Shanxi. Failed to find a living in his hometown due to poverty, Zhao left home to be an apprentice in a blacksmith's shop. Staying in Taiyuan until 1938, Zhao wandered as worker for a copper factory, Taiyuan Arsenal, the Datong-Puzhou Railway. After the invading Japanese troop occupied Taiyuan, Zhao and other workers for the Datong-Puzhou Railway went to Yan’an. In May 1938, Zhao Zhankui entered the Anwu Youth Training Program and later transferred to the Yan’an Workers’ School. One year later, Zhao requested to work in the Yan’an Agricultural Tools Factory where he made great contribution to the making of agricultural tools and military arsenal. In lack of raw materials, machinery, experience and adequate technology, Zhao Zhankui overcame the difficulties with “great passion.” He focused on learning the technology to improve productivity while saving the raw materials and fuel. He was also “keen” at teaching apprentices.

Due to Zhao's “ability to finish tasks regardless of the obstacles” and his “capability to lead everyone”, the central Communist leadership “discovered” him. In 1943, the Party official launched the “Zhao Zhankui Campaign” calling for everyone in the border region to learn from Zhao Zhankui. At this time, Zhao Zhankui of Yan’an was compared to the “Stakhanov of the Soviet Union”. Under the propaganda of the CCP, Zhao Zhankui became not only a role model for work, but also an example for thought. The CCP leadership sought to use the Zhao Zhankui Campaign to improve people's attitude towards work, and to promote the overall productivity in the border region.

After the “Zhao Zhankui Campaign”, Zhao continued to be active in labor movements and politics. In 1948, he attended the Sixth National Labor Conference. In 1949 and 1950, he was elected as the representative for the National People's Congress, and the standing committee member of the Northwestern Labor Union. The Central Government also appointed him as the Vice Minister of the Ministry of Labor for the Northwestern Military and Political Committee.

Huang Baomei 黄宝妹 
Huang Baomei (1931-) was born into an impoverished family in Pudong, Shanghai. At the age of 12, she earned a living with her mother as salt peddlers on the street. One year later, Huang became a child textile worker in the Japanese Yufeng Cotton Mill. When the Communist Party took over the factory, it was "nationalized" and renamed as the Shanghai No.17 Cotton Mill.

Huang Baomei was reported to invent a new way of spinning when she continued to work for the Shanghai No.17 Cotton Mill. Saving the roller lap in spinning, Huang Baomei's technology was reported to save one third of the human labor and enabled the machine to run 24 hours a day. Also, Huang was said to be the best female worker in the Shanghai No.17 Cotton Mill to waste the least roller lap. Because of her “outstanding work performance”, Huang was honored the “National Model Worker” twice in 1956 and 1959. Like other National Model Workers, Huang Baomei received the rare chance to meet Chairman Mao and then went to Beijing by train.

As a National Model Worker, Huang Baomei started to influence many other ordinary people through propaganda. The “advanced life” of her was soon made into a film where Huang Baomei and her co-workers all starred themselves. The film turned out to be successful owing to the “genuine” feelings of the actresses that might have better engaged the audience. Just like other propaganda films of this period, Huang Baomei was filled with state indoctrination, urging viewers to participate in the socialist construction whole-heartedly like the protagonist.

The social impact of National Model Worker Huang Baomei also lies in her fashion choices. According to historian Kar Gerth, Huang Baomei became a fashion icon after her trip to the Soviet Union. Seeing the pretty outfit of Soviet women, Huang felt inspired to follow suit since the Soviet clothing style represented the best version of socialism to her. Back in China, the Soviet-influenced Huang Baomei was broadcast by the state media. Not only did her female colleagues in the factory imitate her style. Women across the whole country who saw Huang Baomei's picture started to desire for the style. By the example of Huang Baomei, Professor Gerth argues that the state sought to channel people's consumerist desires to the direction it wanted.

Other notable workers 

One of the earliest model workers was the teenage textile worker Hao Jianxiu (awarded 1951), who invented the "Hao Jianxiu Work Method". She was sent to study at East China Textile Engineering Institute and was elevated to the upper echelon of Chinese politics, serving as Minister of Textile Industry, secretary of the CPC Central Secretariat, and vice chair of the State Planning Commission.

Another prominent model worker was Ni Zhifu (awarded 1959), a fitter who invented the "Ni Zhifu drill". He was elevated to leadership positions in the municipal governments of Beijing, Shanghai, and Tianjin, and became a member of the Politburo of the Chinese Communist Party. He also served as Chairman of the All-China Federation of Trade Unions.

Liang Jun was a model worker regarded as the first Chinese female tractor driver.

See also
 Udarnik

References 

Communist terminology
Labor in China
Conceptual models